Luxembourg competed at the 1992 Summer Olympics in Barcelona, Spain.

Competitors
The following is the list of number of competitors in the Games.

Results by event

Archery
In its fifth appearance in Olympic archery, Luxembourg was represented by one woman.  She did not advance to the elimination rounds.

Women's Individual Competition:

Shooting

Swimming
Men's 50m Freestyle

Men's 100m Freestyle

Men's 200m Freestyle

References

Nations at the 1992 Summer Olympics
1992
1992 in Luxembourgian sport